Bread&Butter was an annual Berlin-based event and a year-round online shopping hub by Zalando.

Access to pre-launches and rare items, with a particular focus on streetwear and sneakers, is part of Bread&&Butter’s DNA. Brands such as Vans, adidas, Eastpak, Nike, and many more, created unique products specifically for release at Bread&&Butter.

The last Bread&&Butter weekend took place at Arena Berlin from August 31- September 2, 2018, with the tagline, “The Pop-Up of Style and Culture” and a “see now, buy now” concept. The three-day weekend showcased fashion, culture, and music, and attracted around 35,000 visitors.

International music artists performed live each evening at the venue, as well as DJ sets scheduled on different stages throughout the day. The weekend drew influencers and celebrities from around the world to Berlin to take part in various activities as well as in live panel discussions on current cultural topics.

Pop-up fashion shows were a key highlight during the weekend, showing new season collections and limited edition products from a selection of brands. A variety of food stalls were set up across Arena and the surrounding areas, offering popular street food dishes and drinks to guests.

History 
The original “Bread & Butter” tradeshow was founded by German entrepreneur Karl-Heinz Müller together with Christian Geyr and Wolfgang Ahlers and premiered in July 2001 in Cologne-Deutz. It was initially conceived of as a bi-annual fashion industry trade show "for the progressive, contemporary clothing culture". It had a spin-off in Barcelona from 2005 and completely relocated there in 2007. The tradeshow came back to Berlin in the summer of 2009 and relocated to the historical hangars of Tempelhof Airport.

In June 2015, the trade fair was acquired by Berlin-based fashion and tech company Zalando. The e-commerce platform relaunched it in 2016, turning the fashion industry event into a weekend open to the public. It hosts pop-up stands from the brands available on zalando.com, with the aim to ‘democratize fashion’.

Past music lineups have included various international headliners such as A$AP Rocky, M.I.A and FKA twigs, as well as supporting local DJs from Berlin. Each day of the event culminates in an after-party at the venue.

The 2017 fashion shows included collections from HUGO, Topshop and G-Star, as well as a retrospective show by couture designers Viktor & Rolf. The same year, Vivienne Westwood opened an onsite exhibition dedicated to her work, as well as hosting an inspirational talk on stage at Festsaal.

2017 also saw several panel discussions with a variety of topics. Adwoa Aboah hosted an empowering Girl’s Talk session and Wyclef Jean told his life story during an intimate live discussion.

2018 edition focused on fashion accessories, music, and other consumer electronics.

After the 2018 event, Zalando announced that they will discontinue the event, because “It doesn’t fit into our long-term strategy”.

List of B&B shows
Schedule of Bread & Butter shows, their locations and mottos:

References

External links 

Official Bread and Butter website
Official Bread and Butter website
Bread and Butter at Tempelhof website
Trade fair stands at B&B, gallery (2012)
Bread and Butter at Creative Germany

Fashion events in Germany
Events in Berlin
2001 establishments in Germany
Recurring events established in 2001
German fashion
Annual events in Germany
Trade fairs in Germany
Autumn events in Germany